Bucco is a genus of birds in the puffbird family Bucconidae. Birds in the genus are native to the Americas.

The genus Bucco was introduced by the French zoologist Mathurin Jacques Brisson in 1760 with the collared puffbird as the type species. The name is from the Latin bucca for "cheek".

Extant Species
The genus contains four species:

References

 
Bird genera
Bucconidae
Taxa named by Mathurin Jacques Brisson
Taxonomy articles created by Polbot